Nigeria is represented at the 2006 Commonwealth Games in Melbourne by a xx-member strong contingent comprising xx sportspersons and xx officials.

Medals

Silver
Boxing
 Adura Olalehin, Men's Light Heavyweight (– 81 kg)

Table Tennis
 Faith Obiora, Women's Singles EAD

Bronze
Athletics
 Etinosa Eriyo, Men's 100 m EAD T12
 Vitalis Lanshima, Men's 200 m EAD T46
 Christiana Ekpukhon, Folashade Abugan, Joy Eze, and Kudirat Akhigbe, Women's 4x400 m Relay

Boxing
 Nestor Bolum, Men's Bantamweight (– 54 kg)
 Olufemi Ajayi, Men's Welterweight (– 69 kg)

Table Tennis
 Kazeem Nasiru, Monday Merotohun, Segun Toriola, Seun Ajetun, and Tajudeen Jegede, Men's Team Competition
 Segun Toriola, Men's Singles

Nigeria's Team at the 2006 Commonwealth Games

Athletics

Men's Competition
Adekunle Adesoji 	
Jelili Akanni 	
Deji Aliu 	
Uzodinma Alozie 	
Charles Arosanyin 	
Uchenna Emedolu 	
Etinosa Eriyo 	
Peter Emelieze 	
Soji Fasuba 	
James Godday 	
Anthony Imbimoh
Vitalis Lanshima 	
Bola Gee Lawal 	
Godwin Mbakara 	
Audu Musa
Salim Nurudeen 	
Lee Okoroafu 	
Osazuwa Osamudiame
Enefiok Udo-Obong 	
Saul Weigopwa

Women's Competition
Folashade Abugan  	
Olufunke Adeoye 	
Esther Aghatise 	
Kudirat Akhigbe 	
Vivian Chukwuemeka 	
Joy Digha 	
Jane Dike 	
Nkiruka Domike 	
Grace Ebor 	
Christiana Ekpukhon 	
Oluwabunmi Eluwole 	
Joy Eze 	
Otonye Iworima 	
Njideka Iyiazi 	
Mercy Nku 	
Patricia Nnaji 	
Funmilola Ogundana 	
Chinonyelum Ohadugha 	
Virginia Ohagwu	
Endurance Ojokolo 	
Tina Okparaugo 	
Chinedu Onikeku 	
Omolola Sangodeyi

Boxing
Men's Light Flyweight (– 48 kg)
Lukumon Akinolugbade

Men's Flyweight (– 51 kg)
Saheed Oladele Olawale 	

Men's Bantamweight (– 54 kg)
Nestor Bolum 	

Men's Lightweight (– 60 kg)
Rasheed Lawal

Men's Light Welterweight (– 64 kg)
Chukwudi Nwaiwu 	

Men's Welterweight (– 69 kg)
Olufemi Ajayi

Men's Middleweight (– 75 kg)
Davidson King Emenogu

Men's Light Heavyweight (– 81 kg)
Adura Olalehin 	

Men's Heavyweight (– 91 kg)
Emmanuel Izonritei

Men's Super Heavyweight (+ 91 kg)
Olanrewaju Durodola

Field Hockey

Women's team
 Ladi Rogers
 Helen Obialor
 Christy Bulus
 Queen Anuwa
 Ajuma Ejegwa
 Lucy Micheal Aleji
 Lorinda Sati Yohanna
 Justina Onyedum
 Christy Agbo
 Oluchi Obiefule
 Itohan Evbenafese
 Ijenwa Okah
 Lilian Obasi
 Susan Bulus
 Serah Izang
 Patricia Uzuebu
Head coach: Christian Kubeinje

Basketball

Men's team
4-Chidozie Nwoye
5-Ogoh Odaudu
6-Dennis Ebikoro
7-Abubakar Usman
8-Stanley Gumut
9-Abdulrahman Mohammed (captain)
10-Baba Jubril
11-Priwitt Gagara
12-Edem Ekpenyong
13-Nnadubem Muoneke
14-Ejike Ugboaja
15-Olumide Oyedeji
Head coach: Sani Ahmed

Women's team
4-Amaka Adibeli
5-Tamunomiete Whyte
6-Mobolaji Akiode
7-Mercy Okorie (captain)
8-Funmi Ojelabi
10-Tayeloly Adeniyi
11-Adenike Dawodu
12-Parricia Chukwuma
13-Rashidat Sadiq
14-Chioma Udeaja
15-Ezinne James
Head coach Scott Nnaji

See also
Nigeria at the 2004 Summer Olympics
Nigeria at the 2008 Summer Olympics

References
thecgf

2006
Nations at the 2006 Commonwealth Games
Commonwealth Games